Patrik Bojent (born Patrik Karlsson on December 26, 1980), is a Swedish footballer who plays as a defender.

Bojent changed his last name from Karlsson to Bojent in 2008 when he got married.

Career
He has spent a majority of his senior career at Östers IF from Växjö, during six seasons was he a member of their senior squad before he in 2005 moved to Gefle IF for two seasons before he was signed by AIK for the 2007 season. Bojent moved back to Växjö and Östers IF in late July 2009.

In February 2016, he joined Swedish amateur club Åryds IK. He left the club in 2018.

References

External links
Patrik Bojent at aikfotboll.se 
Patrik Bojent at Eliteprospects
 

Living people
1980 births
AIK Fotboll players
Association football defenders
Swedish footballers
Östers IF players
Gefle IF players
Allsvenskan players
Superettan players
Ettan Fotboll players
People from Växjö
Sportspeople from Kronoberg County